Ian Payne (4 October 1949 – 13 September 2015) was a South African cricketer. He played nineteen first-class matches for Western Province between 1968 and 1978.

References

External links
 

1949 births
2015 deaths
South African cricketers
Western Province cricketers
Cricketers from Cape Town